Karl Graf (26 October 1904 – 1 January 1956) was an Austrian footballer. He played in two matches for the Austria national football team from 1928 to 1932.

References

External links
 

1904 births
1956 deaths
Austrian footballers
Austria international footballers
Place of birth missing
Association footballers not categorized by position